Weymouth and Portland Borough Council in Dorset, England existed from 1974 to 2019. One-third of the council was elected each year, followed by one year where there was an election to Dorset County Council instead. The council was abolished and subsumed into Dorset Council in 2019.

Political control
The first elections to the council were held in 1973, initially operating as a shadow authority prior to the district coming into effect the following year. From 1973 until its abolition in 2019 political control of the council was held by the following parties:

Leadership
The role of mayor was largely ceremonial at Weymouth and Portland Borough Council. Political leadership was instead provided by the chair of the management committee, sometimes referred to as the leader of the council. The leaders from 2002 until the council's abolition in 2019 were:

Party representation

Council elections
1973 Weymouth and Portland Borough Council election
1976 Weymouth and Portland Borough Council election
1979 Weymouth and Portland Borough Council election (New ward boundaries)
1980 Weymouth and Portland Borough Council election
1982 Weymouth and Portland Borough Council election
1983 Weymouth and Portland Borough Council election
1984 Weymouth and Portland Borough Council election
1986 Weymouth and Portland Borough Council election
1987 Weymouth and Portland Borough Council election
1988 Weymouth and Portland Borough Council election
1990 Weymouth and Portland Borough Council election
1991 Weymouth and Portland Borough Council election
1992 Weymouth and Portland Borough Council election
1994 Weymouth and Portland Borough Council election
1995 Weymouth and Portland Borough Council election
1996 Weymouth and Portland Borough Council election
1998 Weymouth and Portland Borough Council election
1999 Weymouth and Portland Borough Council election
2000 Weymouth and Portland Borough Council election
2002 Weymouth and Portland Borough Council election
2003 Weymouth and Portland Borough Council election
2004 Weymouth and Portland Borough Council election (New ward boundaries)
2006 Weymouth and Portland Borough Council election
2007 Weymouth and Portland Borough Council election
2008 Weymouth and Portland Borough Council election
2010 Weymouth and Portland Borough Council election
2011 Weymouth and Portland Borough Council election
2012 Weymouth and Portland Borough Council election
2014 Weymouth and Portland Borough Council election
2015 Weymouth and Portland Borough Council election
2016 Weymouth and Portland Borough Council election (last election before abolition)

Borough result maps

Changes between elections

Wyke Regis by-election held after the death of Cllr Doug Hollings

A by-election was held in Melbombe Regis ward on 16 May 2013 following the death of councillor Peter Farrell (Conservative) in April 2013. Farrell had been elected in May 2012 and so the election was for the period May 2013 to May 2016.

A by-election was held in Wey Valley ward on 20 October 2016 following the resignation of Cory Russell (Conservative) who won the seat in May 2014.

Conservative councillor Claudia Moore (Weymouth West) joined the Green Party in December 2016.

A by-election was held in Westham East ward on 4 May 2017 following the resignation of Liberal Democrat councillor Sally Maslin in March 2017. Maslin had won the seat in May 2016.

Byatt had represented Westham on W&PBC and DCC before as well as being the labour leader on W&PBC but switched the Conservatives in 2016

Green councillor Claudia Moore (Weymouth West) resigned from the council on 20 December 2017. She was elected in 2014 and the vacancy was originally going to be left to be filled in the scheduled on-third election on 3 May 2018. However, following the government's approval of the Dorset mergers with first elections 2 May 2019, the election was cancelled and the by-election for Weymouth West was called for 3 May.

Independent councillor David Hawkins (Tophill East) resigned from office in December 2017. Kathy Garcia gained the seat for the Conservatives in a by-election on 8 February 2018. The term ends on 2 May 2019.

Conservative councillor Jason Webb (Tophill West) resigned from office in December 2017. Kerry Baker held the seat for the Conservatives in the by-election on 8 February. The term ends on 2 May 2019.

UKIP councillor Francis Drake (Melcolme Regis) defected to the Conservatives in February 2018.

References

 By-election results

External links
Weymouth and Portland Borough Council

 
Weymouth and Portland
Elections
Isle of Portland
Council elections in Dorset
District council elections in England